Shiokawa Bosai Dam  is an earthfill dam located in Ishikawa Prefecture in Japan. The dam is used for flood control and irrigation. The catchment area of the dam is 39 km2. The dam impounds about 8  ha of land when full and can store 669 thousand cubic meters of water. The construction of the dam was completed in 1956.

See also
List of dams in Japan

References

Dams in Ishikawa Prefecture